Hazel Hurst is an unincorporated community along Marvin Creek in southern McKean County, Pennsylvania, United States. Hazel Hurst has a post office with ZIP code 16733. Hazel Hurst was once an important glass production town with multiple factories, all of which are now closed. Due to the population drain, Hazel Hurst is sometimes considered a ghost town.

See also

 List of ghost towns in Pennsylvania

References

External links

Unincorporated communities in McKean County, Pennsylvania
Unincorporated communities in Pennsylvania